William Madison LaFon (March 8, 1888 – February 4, 1941) was the Democratic President of the West Virginia Senate from Monroe County and served from 1939 to 1941. He died of a heart attack in 1941.

References

West Virginia state senators
Presidents of the West Virginia State Senate
1888 births
1941 deaths
20th-century American politicians
People from Monroe County, West Virginia
People from Union, West Virginia